The 2019–20 season is Pallacanestro Cantù's 84th in existence and the club's 24th consecutive season in the top flight of Italian basketball.

Overview 
The 2019-20 season was hit by the coronavirus pandemic that compelled the federation to suspend and later cancel the competition without assigning the title to anyone. Cantù ended the championship in 11th position.

Kit 
Supplier: EYE Sport Wear / Sponsor: S.Bernardo-Cinelandia

Players 
Rodney Purvis was hired before the early conclusion of the season, therefore he didn't play any games with the team.

Current roster

Depth chart

Squad changes

In

|}

Out

|}

Confirmed 

|}

Coach

Competitions

Serie A

References 

2019–20 in Italian basketball by club